At the hinder part of the medial wall of the vestibule is the orifice of the vestibular aqueduct, which extends to the posterior surface of the petrous portion of the temporal bone.

It transmits a small vein, and contains a tubular prolongation of the membranous labyrinth, the ductus endolymphaticus, which ends in a cul-de-sac, the endolymphatic sac, between the layers of the dura mater within the cranial cavity.

Pathology
Enlargement of the vestibular aqueduct to greater than 2 mm is associated with enlarged vestibular aqueduct syndrome, a disease entity that is associated with one-sided hearing loss in children. The diagnosis can be made by high resolution CT or MRI, with comparison to the adjacent posterior semicircular canal. If the vestibular aqueduct is larger in size, and the clinical presentation is consistent, the diagnosis can be made. Treatment is with mechanical hearing implants. There is an association with Pendred syndrome and incomplete cochlear partition (so called "Mondini dysplasia").

Additional images

References 

Vestibular system